Hemitripterus villosus, the sea raven, is a species of marine ray-finned fish belonging to the subfamily Hemitripterinae of the family Agonidae. The sea raven is found in the northwestern Pacific Ocean off the coast of Russia and Japan.

References

villosus
Taxa named by Peter Simon Pallas
Fish described in 1814